Edgar Robert Moline (2 January 1855 – 16 December 1943) was an Anglo-Austrian born in Austria-Hungary to an English father and an Austrian mother. He moved as a child to England and played first-class cricket for Gloucestershire briefly in 1878. Moline was born in Laibach, then in Austria, but now named Ljubljana and part of Slovenia. Together with his brothers Charles Moline, who played cricket for Cambridge, and Frank Moline, who played for Clifton and Bristol Grammar School, he moved to England.

A right-hand bat, Moline played for an invitational XI at the behest of WG Grace in 1877, scoring two and 38. He also made zero and nine against South Wales Cricket Club in 1880. His two first-class matches for Gloucestershire came against Yorkshire and Sussex in July and August 1878 respectively. He scored thirty-one runs in total, with a batting average of 10.33. Moline also bowled underarm right-arm slow, but he was not called upon to bowl in his first-class career. He died in Lynton, Devon.

References
Notes

Sources
 
 

1855 births
Austro-Hungarian emigrants to England
Cricketers from Bristol
English cricketers
Gloucestershire cricketers
1943 deaths